Ammonius Grammaticus was a 4th-century Egyptian priest who, after the destruction of the pagan temple at Alexandria (389), fled to Constantinople, where he became the tutor of the ecclesiastical historian Socrates.

Life
Ammonius was formerly identified as the  author of a treatise titled Peri homoíōn kai diaphórōn léxeōn (περὶ ὁμοίων καὶ διαφόρων λέξεων, On the Differences of Synonymous Expressions). But it seems more probable that the real author was Herennius Philo of Byblus, who was born during the reign of Nero and lived till the reign of Hadrian, and that the treatise in its present form is a revision prepared by a later Byzantine editor, whose name may have been Ammonius.

References

Attribution:

Ancient Greek grammarians